Neil Anthony Gardner (born 8 December 1974) is a former Jamaican athlete who specialized in the 400 meters hurdles event. As a junior athlete (under 20 years of age) Gardner found much success at the Inter-Secondary School Sports Association National Boys' Championships where he was awarded the Victor Ludorum (Champion Athlete) three years in a row, 1991–1993. Gardner also excelled in the CARIFTA Games, winning several medals between 1989 and 1993.

In 1993, Gardner was awarded a track and field scholarship to the University of Michigan in Ann Arbor, Michigan to compete in the Jumps and Hurdles. While at Michigan, Gardner won three Big Ten titles and was runner-up on six occasions. In his junior year 1996, Gardner won the NCAA Outdoor Championship track and field 400 m hurdle championship title in a time of 49.27 seconds. In 1997, Gardner went on to become the first person in the history of the NCAA to win the NCAA championship titles in both the 400 m hurdle event (outdoors) as well as the 55 m hurdle event (indoors), which he did in a time of 7.18
seconds.

His personal best time of 48.30 in the 400 m hurdles at the Olympic game in 1996, ranked Gardner among the top 10 performers of all time for the NCAA as well as the Central American and Caribbean region. This time was also a varsity record for the University of Michigan.  Gardner is ranked 6th among Jamaican 400 m hurdlers of all time.

The Olympic Games and IAAF World Championships
Gardner represented Jamaica in the 1996 Olympic games in Atlanta, Georgia where he was a semi-finalist in the 400m hurdle event. Gardner ran 48.59 seconds in the preliminaries and was the 6th fastest qualifier overall for the semifinals.  Gardner ran 48.30 seconds in his semifinal heat, placing fifth in a four way photo finish, just missing the fourth place qualifying spot by 0.02 seconds. The second, third and fourth-place finishers each was credited with the same time of 48.28 seconds.  Gardner's time would have placed him third in the other semi-final and would have guaranteed him a spot in the final. Had Gardner competed in any other Olympic Game, in any other year, his time would have not only qualified him for the finals, but would have won on many occasions.

In 2001, Gardner was a semi-finalist in the 400 meters hurdles at the 8th IAAF World Championships in Athletics in Edmonton, Canada again representing his native, Jamaica.

Academic years and later career 

Gardner received a full athletic scholarship to attend the University of Michigan in 1993. Gardner graduated from Michigan with a 3.24 GPA in Biochemistry in December 1997. Gardner then returned to Jamaica in January 1998 where he competed professionally in track and field until 2005.  Gardner was the first recipient of a scholarship through the World Olympians Association and the World Federation of Chiropractic, to study chiropractic at Parker College of Chiropractic. Gardner graduated from Parker College in August 2009 with a 4.0 GPA, Summa Cum Laude as the class valedictorian. He also received two Bachelor of Science degrees in Anatomy and Health & Wellness.  Dr. Neil Gardner opened his chiropractic clinic, Gardner Chiropractic & Wellness Center, in December 2009 in Richardson, Texas.  He recently moved back to Jamaica to open his clinic, Gardner Chiropractic & Neurology Ltd. in Kingston, Jamaica.

Honors and awards
Gardner was inducted into the University of Michigan Men's Track & Field Hall of Fame in May 2007. In March 2010, Gardner was named High School Athlete of the Decade for the 1990s, by the Inter-Secondary School Sport Association, Kingston, Jamaica.

Dr. Neil Gardner is the 2011 recipient of the Courtney Walsh Award for Excellence.

Accomplishments and Major Competition results

ISSA National Boy’s Championships Results

CARIFTA Games results

Pan American Junior Championships results

NCAA Championships

26th Olympic Games

8th IAAF World Championships

Other Major Competitions

References

External links 
 IAAF Profile of Neil Gardner
 Jamaica Olympic Association
 World Olympians Association
 Inter-Secondary School Sports Association
 International Sports Chiropractic Association
 Parker College of Chiropractic
 Gardner Chiropractic & Neurology Ltd.

1974 births
Living people
Sportspeople from Kingston, Jamaica
Athletes (track and field) at the 1996 Summer Olympics
Jamaican male hurdlers
Olympic athletes of Jamaica
Michigan Wolverines men's track and field athletes
Jamaican chiropractors
Parker University alumni